Alicia Scherson (born 1974 in Santiago, Chile) is a Chilean film director, screenwriter, and producer.

Biography 
Scherson studied filmmaking in the Escuela de Cine de Cuba and in 1999 received a Fulbright Scholarship to study for a Master of Fine Arts from the University of Illinois at Chicago.

Scherson's debut film Play was awarded Best Director at the 2005 Tribeca Film Festival. The Times called Play a "doozy of a showreel," but also criticized its "sketchy emotional construction." Scherson's second film, Tourists, was selected for the 2009 Tiger Awards Competition.

Scherson collaborated with author Alejandro Zambra on Vida de Familia, a film based on one of his stories. The 80 minute feature was screened at the Sundance Film Festival in January 2017.

Filmography

As a writer
  2017 Vida de Familia
  2015 El Bosque de Karadima: La Serie (TV mini-series) (1 episode)- "La Iniciación"
  2015 Rara
  2015 El Bosque de Karadima (written by) 
  2013 Il Futuro (written by) 
  2009 Optical Illusions (writer) 
  2009 Tourists (writer) 
  2005 Play 
  2002 Crying Underwater (short)

As a director
  2017 Vida de Familia (co-directed with Cristián Jiménez)
  2013 Il Futuro 
  2009 Tourists 
  2005 Baño de mujeres (short) 
  2005 Play 
  2002 Crying Underwater (short)

As a producer
  2015 Las Plantas (associate producer) 
  2013 Las Analfabetas (co-producer) 
  2011 Verano (executive producer) 
  2009 Tourists (executive producer) 
  2002 Crying Underwater (short) (producer)

As an actress
  2011 Verano - Turista Sewell
  2005 Play - Woman at Photomat (uncredited)
  2001 Time's Up!

As an editor
  2002 Crying Underwater (short) 
  2002 Mi hermano y yo (documentary)

As part of the camera and electrical department
  2002 Crying Underwater (short) (camera operator)

As part of the miscellaneous crew
  2012 Thursday Till Sunday (script consultant)

Thanks
  2012 Thursday Till Sunday (the director wishes to thank) 
  2011 Zoológico (the director wishes to thank) 
  2011 Bonsái (special thanks) 
  2011 Metro Cuadrado (thanks) 
  2005 Time Off (thanks)

External links

References

1974 births
Living people
Chilean film directors
Chilean women writers
People from Santiago
University of Illinois alumni
Chilean women film directors
Chilean screenwriters